is a Japanese voice actor from Tokyo, Japan.

Voice roles

Anime

Video games

Flash Hiders, (1993) Horow
Mega Man: The Power Battle, (1995) Proto Man, Guts Man
Street Fighter Alpha 2, (1996) Rolento
Mega Man 2: The Power Fighters, (1996) Proto Man, Centaur Man, Guts Man, Shadow Man, Air Man, Dive Man
Mega Man X4 (1997) Colonel
Legend of Legaia, (1998) Gala
Street Fighter EX2 Plus, (1999) Vulcano Rosso
Persona 2, (1999) Philemon and Nyarlathotep
Street Fighter EX3, (2000) Vulcano Rosso

Tokusatsu

Narration

Overseas dubbing

References

External links
 Official agency profile 
 

1962 births
Living people
Japanese male video game actors
Japanese male voice actors
Male voice actors from Tokyo
20th-century Japanese male actors 
21st-century Japanese male actors